Yudi Khoedirun (born 5 September 1988) is an Indonesian professional footballer who plays as a centre-back for and captains Sulut United.

Club career

Sulut United
He was signed for Sulut United to play in Liga 2 in the 2019 season.

International career
In 2009, Yudi represented the Indonesia U-23, in the 2009 Southeast Asian Games.

References

External links
 Yudi Khoerudin at Soccerway
 Yudi Khoerudin at Liga Indonesia

Indonesian footballers
Living people
1987 births
Sundanese people
People from Karawang Regency
Sportspeople from West Java
Persikota Tangerang players
Pro Duta FC players
Persib Bandung players
Persiraja Banda Aceh players
Persiba Balikpapan players
Liga 1 (Indonesia) players
Association football defenders